The 2004 Speed World Challenge season was the 15th season of the Sports Car Club of America's World Challenge series. The series' title sponsor was television network Speed Channel, who broadcast all the races. Championships were awarded for grand touring and touring cars.  The season began on March 19 and ran for ten rounds. Tommy Archer and Audi won the championships in GT, and Bill Auberlen and BMW won in Touring Car. The season marked the first wins for the Cadillac brand, a step up for General Motors after three of its brands declined in the nineties.

Schedule

References

GT World Challenge America
Speed World Challenge